is a paralympic athlete from Japan competing mainly in category F51 club throwing events.

Anryo competed in both the 2000 and 2004 Summer Paralympics. In the 2000 event he competed in the discus and won a silver medal in the club throwing event. In the 2004 games he concentrated on the club throwing and finished sixth.

References

Paralympic athletes of Japan
Athletes (track and field) at the 2000 Summer Paralympics
Athletes (track and field) at the 2004 Summer Paralympics
Paralympic silver medalists for Japan
Living people
Medalists at the 2000 Summer Paralympics
Year of birth missing (living people)
Paralympic medalists in athletics (track and field)
Paralympic club throwers